Mediterraneo may refer to:
Mediterraneo, 1991 Italian war comedy-drama
Mediterráneo, 1971 album by Joan Manuel Serrat
Mediterraneo Stadium in Almería, Spain
, Spanish newspaper

See also
Mediterranean (disambiguation)
Mediterranea University of Reggio Calabria